Merrimack County is a county in the U.S. state of New Hampshire. As of the 2020 Census, the population was 153,808, making it the third-most populous county in New Hampshire. Its county seat is Concord, the state capital. The county was organized in 1823 from parts of Hillsborough and Rockingham counties, and is named for the Merrimack River. Merrimack County comprises the Concord, NH Micropolitan Statistical Area, which in turn constitutes a portion of the Boston–Worcester–Providence, MA–RI–NH–CT Combined Statistical Area. In 2010, the center of population of New Hampshire was located in Merrimack County, in the town of Pembroke.

Geography
It is the third-largest county in New Hampshire by land area. The highest point in Merrimack county is Mount Kearsarge, on the border of Warner and Wilmot, at 2,937 feet (895 m).

Adjacent counties
 Belknap County (northeast)
 Strafford County (east)
 Rockingham County (southeast)
 Hillsborough County (south)
 Sullivan County (west)
 Grafton County (northwest)

National protected area
 John Hay National Wildlife Refuge

Demographics

2000 census
As of the census of 2000, there were 136,225 people, 51,843 households, and 35,460 families living in the county. There were 56,244 housing units at an average density of 60 per square mile (23/km2). The racial makeup of the county was 97.08% White, 0.54% Black or African American, 0.23% Native American, 0.86% Asian, 0.02% Pacific Islander, 0.23% from other races, and 1.04% from two or more races.  1.00% of the population were Hispanic or Latino of any race. 16.5% were of English, 13.4% Irish, 12.7% French, 11.0% French Canadian, 8.4% American, 6.4% German and 6.0% Italian ancestry. 94.2% spoke English, 2.9% French and 1.1% Spanish as their first language.

There were 51,843 households, out of which 33.90% had children under the age of 18 living with them, 54.90% were married couples living together, 9.80% had a female householder with no husband present, and 31.60% were non-families. 24.60% of all households were made up of individuals, and 9.00% had someone living alone who was 65 years of age or older.  The average household size was 2.51 and the average family size was 3.00.

In the county, the population was spread out, with 24.90% under the age of 18, 8.10% from 18 to 24, 30.60% from 25 to 44, 24.00% from 45 to 64, and 12.40% who were 65 years of age or older.  The median age was 38 years. For every 100 females, there were 97.00 males.  For every 100 females age 18 and over, there were 93.70 males.

The median income for a household in the county was $48,522, and the median income for a family was $56,842. Males had a median income of $37,722 versus $27,207 for females. The per capita income for the county was $23,208.  About 4.10% of families and 5.90% of the population were below the poverty line, including 6.60% of those under age 18 and 5.70% of those age 65 or over.

2010 census
As of the 2010 United States census, there were 146,445 people, 57,069 households, and 38,104 families living in the county. The racial makeup of the county was 95.3% white, 1.6% Asian, 1.0% black or African American, 0.3% American Indian, 0.3% from other races, and 1.4% from two or more races. Those of Hispanic or Latino origin made up 1.6% of the population. In terms of ancestry, 20.5% were English, 20.4% were Irish, 10.1% were German, 9.7% were Italian, 9.7% were French Canadian, 5.2% were Scottish, and 4.9% were American.

Of the 57,069 households, 31.3% had children under the age of 18 living with them, 52.4% were married couples living together, 9.9% had a female householder with no husband present, 33.2% were non-families, and 25.4% of all households were made up of individuals. The average household size was 2.46 and the average family size was 2.94. The median age was 41.4 years.

The median income for a household in the county was $63,012 and the median income for a family was $75,268. Males had a median income of $50,880 versus $37,351 for females. The per capita income for the county was $30,544. About 5.2% of families and 8.1% of the population were below the poverty line, including 10.6% of those under age 18 and 7.4% of those age 65 or over.

Politics and government

|}

County Commission
The executive power of Merrimack County's government is held by three county commissioners, each representing one of the three commissioner districts within the county.
 

In addition to the County Commission, there are five directly elected officials: they include County Attorney, Register of Deeds, County Sheriff, Register of Probate, and County Treasurer.

Legislative branch
The legislative branch of Merrimack County is made up of all of the members of the New Hampshire House of Representatives from the county. In total, as of 2022 there are 46 members from 30 different districts.

Communities

Cities
 Concord (county seat)
 Franklin

Towns

 Allenstown
 Andover
 Boscawen
 Bow
 Bradford
 Canterbury
 Chichester
 Danbury
 Dunbarton
 Epsom
 Henniker
 Hill
 Hooksett
 Hopkinton
 Loudon
 New London
 Newbury
 Northfield
 Pembroke
 Pittsfield
 Salisbury
 Sutton
 Warner
 Webster
 Wilmot

Census-designated places

 Blodgett Landing
 Bradford
 Contoocook
 Henniker
 Hooksett
 Loudon
 New London
 Pittsfield
 South Hooksett
 Suncook
 Tilton Northfield
 Warner

Villages
 East Andover
 Elkins
 North Sutton
 Penacook
 South Newbury
 South Sutton

Education
School districts include:

K-12 districts:

 Bow School District
 Concord School District
 Franklin School District
 Hopkinton School District
 Kearsarge Regional School District
 Merrimack Valley School District
 Newfound Area School District
 Pembroke School District
 Pittsfield School District
 Shaker Regional School District
 Winnisquam Regional School District

Secondary districts:
 John Stark Regional School District

Elementary districts:

 Allenstown School District
 Andover School District
 Chichester School District
 Dunbarton School District
 Epsom School District
 Henniker School District
 Hill School District
 Hooksett School District

Hooksett sends its high school students to Pinkerton Academy, a privately-endowed publicly-funded high school in Derry, Rockingham County. Previously Hooksett sent high school students to the Manchester School District.

See also
 National Register of Historic Places listings in Merrimack County, New Hampshire

References

External links

 Merrimack County official website
 National Register of Historic Places listing for Merrimack County

 
Counties in Greater Boston
1823 establishments in New Hampshire
Populated places established in 1823
Micropolitan areas of New Hampshire
New Hampshire placenames of Native American origin